Dorothy Patrick (born Dorothea Davis; June 3, 1921 – May 31, 1987) was a Canadian-American film actress and a John Robert Powers model.

Early life
Patrick was born on June 3, 1921, in St. Boniface, Manitoba, Canada, the daughter of Mr. and Mrs. Robert E. Davis. As a teen, Patrick was a professional photographic model for young ladies' fashions in Creed's, Hudson's Bay and Sears department store catalogues, popular in Canada.

After growing up in Winnipeg, in 1938 at age 17, she and her "backstage" mother, Eva, emigrated to the United States. Settling in New York City at tony Tudor City in Manhattan, Patrick became a fashion model with the John Robert Powers Agency. She was seen on the runways of the City's haute couture salons and in fashion and entertainment magazines of the day.

Career
During her early career she was billed under her birth name, Dorothea Davis.

In 1939, Patrick won Samuel Goldwyn's Gateway to Hollywood talent-search contest. With a movie contract in hand, she moved to Hollywood with her mother and young son to live in Culver City, California and work at nearby MGM studios. Patrick trained at the studio's repertory workshop and first appeared as a Goldwyn Girl in Up in Arms starring  Danny Kaye (1944). Her most noted MGM appearance was opposite Robert Walker in the Jerome Kern musical showcase Till the Clouds Roll By (1946).

As a "Queen of the Bs," she continued to appear in films produced in the 1940s and 1950s, including High Wall (1947) with Robert Taylor; New Orleans (1947) with Louis Armstrong and Billie Holiday; The Mighty McGurk (1947) with Wallace Beery; Follow Me Quietly (1949) with William Lundigan,  and the Fritz Lang-directed noir classic, House by the River (1950). Apart from her film career, during the 1940s, she played several roles on Lux Radio Theatre.

In the early days of television, she made guest appearances on the locally produced TV game show, Mike Stokey's Pantomime Quiz. The Korean War-era saw her at celebrity appearances for USO and she was Miss Naval Air Force Recruiting 1951. At Columbia Pictures, Patrick co-starred with Preston Foster and Wayne Morris in an oil wild-catting yarn, The Big Gusher (1951), and in a modern-day western, Outlaw Stallion (1954), opposite Billy Gray with Phil Carey.

Patrick co-starred or was supporting actress in a series of Republic programmers. The studio was best known releasing Saturday matinee serials, westerns, mysteries and crime dramas. Republic films she made include 711 Ocean Drive (1950) with Edmond O'Brien, Joanne Dru and  Otto Kruger (caps with a slam-bang gun-chase scene at Hoover [Boulder] Dam); the "true life" crime drama Lonely Heart Bandits (1950) with John Eldredge;  the genre western Thunder Pass (1954) with Dane Clark, John Carradine and Andy Devine, and a "Gringos go south-of-the-border" comedy, Belle of Old Mexico (1950).

For several summer seasons Patrick was also seen on stage at the La Jolla Playhouse. One summer she co-starred opposite Howard Duff in Anniversary Waltz; another season playing "Mrs. Miniver." Her last movies were in 1955 as Dorothy Davis Patrick at 20th Century Fox: Violent Saturday (1955) as the wife of Victor Mature and The View from Pompey's Head (1955) with Richard Egan and Dana Wynter.That same year, Patrick took a hiatus from Hollywood to raise her two adolescent sons back East in Short Hills, a New Jersey suburb of New York City. 

Returning to Hollywood in 1961 and up for a few parts on television, she found her creative niche appearing with the Leontovich Theatre in West Hollywood for several seasons while a real estate agent in Beverly Hills. A working, lifelong Screen Actors Guild actress, Patrick appeared in more than 35 motion picture films and television productions.

Personal life
In 1939, Patrick married professional hockey player Lynn Patrick in Manhattan. Her son from this marriage was Lester Lee Patrick (1940–1996).

A few years into her film career, she married her second husband, noted Beverly Hills dentist-to-the-stars, Sterling Trevling "Doc" Bowen. That marriage produced  one son, Sterling Terrence "Terry" Bowen (b. 1944).

Death
On May 31, 1987, Patrick died of heart attack. She was 65 years old. She was interred at the "columbarium-to-the-stars", Pierce Brothers Westwood in West Los Angeles, California.

Filmography

References

External links

 
 
 
 
 Till the Clouds Roll By (full movie) at Internet Archive.

1921 births
1987 deaths
20th-century Canadian actresses
Actresses from Winnipeg
Canadian emigrants to the United States
Canadian people of English descent
Canadian film actresses
Metro-Goldwyn-Mayer contract players
Burials at Westwood Village Memorial Park Cemetery
People from Saint Boniface, Winnipeg